Jakub Špicar (born 11 June 1993) is a Czech sprint canoeist.

He competed at the 2021 ICF Canoe Sprint World Championships, winning a bronze medal in the K-1 500 m distance.

References

External links

1993 births
Living people
People from Nymburk
Czech male canoeists
ICF Canoe Sprint World Championships medalists in kayak
Sportspeople from the Central Bohemian Region